Acleris affinatana is a species of moth of the family Tortricidae. It is found in South Korea, North Korea, China, Japan and Russia (Siberia, Amur).

The wingspan is about 18 mm.

The larvae feed on Quercus dentata, Quercus serrata, Quercus acutissima and Zelkovia scheideriana.

References

	

Moths described in 1883
affinatana
Moths of Asia